Carman was a provincial electoral division in the Canadian province of Manitoba. It was created by redistribution in 1999, with territory from Lakeside, Morris, and the now-defunct riding of Gladstone.

Carman was located in the southern region of Manitoba. It was bordered to the north by Portage la Prairie, to the west by Turtle Mountain, to the east by Morris, and to the south by Pembina and Emerson.

The riding was mostly rural. It included the communities of Carman, Somerset, Treherne, St. Claude, Notre Dame de Lourdes, Miami and Elm Creek. Carman also included the Long Plain Reserve, the Dakota Reserve, the Swan Lake Reserve and the Spruce Woods Provincial Park.

The riding's population in 1996 was 18,867. In 1999, the average family income was $43,401, and the unemployment rate was 3.00%. Agriculture accounts for 38% of all industry in the riding, followed by health and social services at 9%. Sixteen per cent of Carman's residents are francophone, the fourth-highest total in the province. Twelve per cent of the population is German, and a further 7% are aboriginal.

Carman was last held by Progressive Conservative MLA Blaine Pedersen, who was elected as a Progressive Conservative.

For the 2011 election, Carman was dissolved into Portage la Prairie and the newly created riding of Midland.

List of provincial representatives

Electoral results

References

Former provincial electoral districts of Manitoba